Neti can refer to:
Neti (mythology), an underworld god in Mesopotamian mythology
Neti (Hatha Yoga) a Hatha Yoga technique for cleansing air passageways in the head
Neti pot, or Jala neti, a device used for nasal irrigation
Neti neti, a chant or mantra in Hinduism, and in particular Jnana Yoga and Advaita Vedanta
Neti, an alien race in Star Wars

NETI, a native name of Novosibirsk State Technical University

See also

Netti (disambiguation)